Jahanabad-e Olya may refer to:
 Jahanabad-e Olya, Golestan
 Jahanabad-e Olya, Sistan and Baluchestan

See also
 Jahanabad-e Bala (disambiguation)